Fentiazac is a nonsteroidal anti-inflammatory drug used for joint and muscular pain.

See also
Fenclozic acid

References

Nonsteroidal anti-inflammatory drugs
Thiazoles
Acetic acids
Chlorobenzenes